Lac Saint-Jean is a large, relatively shallow lake in south-central Quebec, Canada, in the Laurentian Highlands. Its name in the Innu language is Piekuakamu.

Description

The lake is fed by dozens of small rivers, including the Ashuapmushuan, the Mistassini, the Peribonka, the Des Aulnaies, the Métabetchouane, and the Ouiatchouane. The towns on its shores include Alma, Dolbeau-Mistassini, Roberval, Normandin, and Saint-Félicien. Three Regional County Municipalities lie on its shores: Lac-Saint-Jean-Est, Le Domaine-du-Roy, and Maria-Chapdelaine.

History
The lake was named Piekuakami by the Innu, the Indigenous people who occupied the area at the time of European arrival. It was given its French name after Jean de Quen, a Jesuit missionary who in 1647 was the first European to reach its shores.

Industry on the lake was dominated by the fur trade until the 19th century. Colonization began in the Saguenay–Lac-Saint-Jean region in the early 19th century and continued intensively until the early 20th century. Industry was mainly forestry and agriculture. In the 20th century, pulp and paper mills and aluminum smelting rose to importance, encouraged by hydroelectric dams at Alma and on the Péribonka River. Lac Saint-Jean also has an important summer resort and sport-fishing industry.

The area is featured in the classic French-language novel Maria Chapdelaine by Louis Hémon published in 1914 and subsequently translated into twenty languages.

In the 1940s, during World War II, Lac Saint-Jean, along with various other regions within Canada, such as the Saguenay, Saint Helen's Island and Hull, Quebec, had Prisoner-of-war camps.  Lac Saint-Jean's was numbered and remained unnamed just like most of Canada's other war prisons. The prisoners of war (POWs) were classified into categories including their nationality and civilian or military status. By 1942 this region had two camps with at least 50 POWs. Prisoners worked the land, including lumbering and assisting in the production of pulp and paper.

Geology
The bedrock of the Saguenay-Lac-Saint-Jean region consists largely of Precambrian igneous and metamorphic rocks. They are mostly composed of high-grade metamorphic rocks, amphibolite to granulite gneiss, that are intruded by anorthosite, mangerite, charnockite, and granite plutonic rocks. The Lac Saint-Jean anorthosite is the major mafic intrusion present in the area. These rocks comprise the Grenville Province of southern Quebec. It consists of fragments of island arcs and continental crust accreted to the south-eastern edge of Precambrian North American, Laurentia.

Lac Saint-Jean lies within a elongated rift valley that is known as the Lac Saint-Jean Lowlands. These lowlands are an elongated flat-bottomed basin formed by the Saguenay Graben by the displacement of Grenville crystalline rocks. This basin is bounded by normal faults running parallel to its length. It extends from just west of Lac Saint-Jean along the Saguenay River to the Saint Lawrence Valley where is it truncated by St. Lawrence rift system.

Preserved within the down-faulted interior of the Saguenay Graben are two large eroded, isolated patches, known as outliers, of Paleozoic, Middle Ordovician, sedimentary rock composed of limestones and shales overlying Precambrian basement. The Lac-Saint-Jean outlier rests against the south wall of the graben south of Lac Saint-Jean and extends to the west of the lake. The Chicoutimi (Saguenay) outlier rests against the north wall of the graben and extends southward to a few kilometers from the Saguenay River north of Chicoutimi. These Middle Ordovician sedimentary rocks consist of sandstones, micritic limestones and highly fossiliferous, alternating beds of limestones and shales. These rocks have been preferentially eroded by repeated glaciations exhuming the Saguenay Graben.

The Quaternary sediments include glacial, marine, glaciofluvial sediments and post-glacial alluvial and delta plain sediments.

The area was covered by ice sheets several times throughout the Pleistocene. The valley formed by the Saguenay Graben being oriented more or less parallel to the glacial flow, became a preferred path for ice flow and resulted in deep excavation of the bedrock.The glaciers cut into the graben and widened it in some places as well as making it considerable deeper in others. At the time of retreat of the last ice sheet, the region had been depressed below contemporaneous sea level. As a result, as the Laurentide Ice Sheet retreated, the Saguenay Graben was flooded by marine waters to form the Laflamme Sea. As the land rose in response to considerable Post-glacial rebound, the bottom of the Saguenay Graben was blanketed by the Saguenay River with deltaic and terrestrial fluvial sediments to form the modern day Lac Saint-Jean Lowlands.

Notable people
 Jean Ratelle, NHL Hall of Famer and Team Canada 1972 member 
 Mario Chevrette, Ph.D of Molecular and Cell Biology and McGill Professor 
 Guillaume Côté, National Ballet of Canada principal dancer

See also
List of lakes of Quebec

References

External links

 History of the annual crossing swim

Saint-Jean